The 31st women's Giro d'Italia, or Giro Rosa, was held from 11 to 19 September 2020. It is considered the most prestigious stage race of the women's calendar and of the 2020 UCI Women's World Tour. The race was originally scheduled from 26 June to 5 July, but was postponed to mid-September due to the COVID-19 pandemic in Italy and reduced to 9 stages rather than the originally planned 10.

Route
The race consisted of 9 stages totalling , which began in Grosseto on 11 September with a team time trial and finished in Motta Montecorvino on 19 September.

Teams
All eight UCI Women's WorldTeams, as well as fifteen UCI Women's Continental Teams, participated in the race. Each of the twenty-three teams entered six riders, for a total of 138 riders. Of 85 of these riders finished the race.

UCI Women's WorldTeams

 
 
 
 
 
 
 
 

UCI Women's Continental Teams

Stages

Stage 1
11 September 2020 — Grosseto to Grosseto, team time trial (TTT)

Stage 2
12 September 2020 — Civitella Paganico to Arcidosso,

Stage 3
13 September 2020 — Santa Fiora to Assisi,

Stage 4
14 September 2020 — Assisi to Tivoli,

Stage 5
15 September 2020 — Terracina to Terracina,

Stage 6
16 September 2020 — Torre del Greco to Nola,

Stage 7
17 September 2020 — Nola to Maddaloni,

Stage 8
18 September 2020 — Castelnuovo della Daunia to San Marco la Catola, 

Race leader Annemiek van Vleuten and points classification leader Marianne Vos were among those involved in a crash with under three kilometers to go on stage 7. As a result of injuries sustained in that crash, van Vleuten, along with teammate Amanda Spratt, were forced to abandon the race, while Vos escaped with only abrasions. Due to van Vleuten's withdrawal, second placed Katarzyna Niewiadoma wore the pink jersey on stage 8. Van Vleuten subsequently started the World Championships after surgery on her wrist. Amanda Spratt withdrew from the World Championships.

Stage 9
19 September 2020 — Motta Montecorvino to Motta Montecorvino,

Classification leadership table

In the 2020 Giro d'Italia Femminile, five different jerseys were awarded. 

The most important was the general classification (GC), which was calculated by adding each cyclist's finishing times on each stage. Time bonuses were awarded to the first three finishers on all stages with the exception of the time trials: the stage winner won a ten-second bonus, with six and four seconds for the second and third riders respectively. Bonus seconds were also awarded to the first three riders at intermediate sprints; three seconds for the winner of the sprint, two seconds for the rider in second and one second for the rider in third. The rider with the least accumulated time was the race leader, identified by a pink jersey. This classification was considered the most important of the 2020 Giro d'Italia Femminile, and the winner of the classification was considered the winner of the race.

Additionally, there was a points classification, which awarded a cyclamen jersey. In the points classification, cyclists received points for finishing in the top 10 in a stage, and unlike in the points classification in the Tour de France, the winners of all stages – with the exception of the team time trial, which awards no points towards the classification – were awarded the same number of points. For winning a stage, a rider earned 15 points, with 12 for second, 10 for third, 8 for fourth, 6 for fifth with a point fewer per place down to a single point for 10th place.

There was also a mountains classification, the leadership of which was marked by a green jersey. In the mountains classification, points towards the classification were won by reaching the top of a climb before other cyclists. Each climb was categorised as either second, or third-category, with more points available for the higher-categorised climbs; however on both categories, the top five riders were awarded points. The fourth jersey represents the young rider classification, marked by a white jersey. This was decided in the same way as the general classification, but only riders born on or after 1 January 1997 were eligible to be ranked in the classification.

The fifth and final jersey represented the classification for Italian riders, marked by a blue jersey. This was decided in the same way as the general classification, but only riders born in Italy were eligible to be ranked in the classification. There was also a team classification, in which the times of the best three cyclists per team on each stage were added together; the leading team at the end of the race was the team with the lowest total time. The daily team leaders wore red dossards in the following stage.

 On stage 2, Elena Cecchini, who was second in the Italian rider classification, wore the blue jersey, because first placed Elisa Longo Borghini wore the pink jersey as the leader of the general classification.
 On stage 3, Katarzyna Niewiadoma, who was third in the points classification, wore the violet jersey, because first placed Annemiek van Vleuten wore the pink jersey as the leader of the general classification, and second placed Anna van der Breggen wore the Dutch national jersey as the defending Dutch national road race champion. Because these riders were also the first three in the mountains classification, the green jersey was worn by fourth placed Cecilie Uttrup Ludwig.
 On stage 4, Cecilie Uttrup Ludwig, who was second in the points classification, wore the violet jersey, because first placed Annemiek van Vleuten wore the pink jersey as the leader of the general classification.
 On stage 5, Katarzyna Niewiadoma, who was third in the points classification, wore the violet jersey, because first placed Annemiek van Vleuten wore the pink jersey as the leader of the general classification, and second placed Cecilie Uttrup Ludwig wore the green jersey as the leader of the mountains classification.
 On stage 8, Katarzyna Niewiadoma, who was second in the general classification, wore the pink jersey, because first placed Annemiek van Vleuten abandoned the race after stage 7 due to injuries sustained in a crash.

Final classification standings

General classification

Points classification

Mountains classification

Young rider classification

Italian rider classification

Teams classification

Prize money
The prize money for the Giro Rosa 2020  will be divided as follows (all in Euros):  

There are additional prizes for classification winners.

See also
 2020 in women's road cycling

Notes

References

External links

2020 UCI Women's World Tour
2020
2020 in Italian sport
Giro Rosa
Cycling events postponed due to the COVID-19 pandemic
Giro Rosa, 2020